The Association of Grace Baptist Churches (South East) (AGBC(SE)) is an association of churches in London and South East England.

As of 2022 there are 65 member churches in the association.
All the members of the association are independent Baptist churches of an evangelical persuasion. All member churches with income of £100k or less are Excepted Charities.

The association is a registered charity and is a corporate partner of Affinity. As part of its work it provides advice and support for its members.  It is also involved in lobbying the government on issues important to its members, through its  membership of Churches' Legislation Advisory Service (CLAS).

History
The Association was established in 1871 as the Metropolitan Association of Strict Baptist Churches (MASBC), an association of 23 Strict Baptist churches. John Stevens, a Baptist minister in London, was noted for his influence in the formation of the association, which was motivated by concern to maintain clear Calvinist doctrines.

The name "Strict" represented the position that the churches had on a strict or closed communion (also known at the Lord's Table), whereby the churches required all those taking part in this ordinance to be baptised by immersion.  The name "Strict" was, however, often misunderstood and gave the wrong impression to those outside of the churches, and so they later became known as "Grace Baptist" churches.  This was reflected in the association's change of name to the current form.

As of 2022 there are 65 member churches in the association.

See also
 Grace Baptist
 List of Strict Baptist churches

References

External links

1871 establishments in England
Baptist denominations established in the 19th century
Calvinist organizations established in the 19th century
Reformed denominations in the United Kingdom